Pomaderris briagolensis is a species of flowering plant in the family Rhamnaceae and is endemic to Victoria, Australia. It is a shrub with hairy branchlets, egg-shaped or oblong leaves and panicles of white to rust-coloured flowers.

Description
The upper surface of the leaves is glossy and the lower surface is densely covered with white, star-shaped hairs. Flowering occurs from September to October.

Taxonomy
Pomaderris briagolensis was first formally described in 2010 by Andre Messina in the journal Muelleria from specimens collected he collected near Briagolong in 2006. The specific epithet (briagolensis) refers to the type location.

Distribution and habitat
This pomaderris grows in rocky places in the catchment of Freestone Creek near Briagolong in eastern Victoria.

Conservation status
This pomaderris is listed as "endangered" under the Victorian Government Flora and Fauna Guarantee Act 1988 and the Department of Environment and Primary Industries's Advisory List of Rare Or Threatened Plants In Victoria.

References

briagolensis
Flora of Victoria (Australia)
Plants described in 2010